The staghorn coral (Acropora cervicornis) is a branching, stony coral with cylindrical branches ranging from a few centimetres to over two metres in length and height. It occurs in back reef and fore reef environments from  depth. The upper limit is defined by wave forces, and the lower limit is controlled by suspended sediments and light availability. Fore reef zones at intermediate depths  were formerly dominated by extensive single-species stands of staghorn coral until the mid-1980s. This has been one of the three most important Caribbean corals in terms of its contribution to reef growth and fishery habitat.

Distribution
Staghorn coral is found throughout the Florida Keys, the Bahamas, and the Caribbean islands. This coral occurs in the western Gulf of Mexico, but is absent from U.S. waters in the Gulf of Mexico, as well as Bermuda and the west coast of South America. The northern limit is on the east coast of Florida, around Jupiter, Florida.

Reproduction
The dominant mode of reproduction for staghorn corals is asexual, with new colonies forming when branches break off a colony and reattach to the substrate. This life history trait allows rapid population recovery from physical disturbances such as storms. However, it makes recovery from disease or bleaching episodes (where entire colonies or even entire stands are killed) very difficult.

Sexual reproduction is via broadcast spawning of gametes into the water column once each year in August or September. Individual colonies are both male and female (simultaneous hermaphrodites) and will release millions of gametes. The coral larvae (planula) live in the plankton for several days until finding a suitable area to settle; unfortunately, very few larvae survive to settle and metamorphose into new colonies.

Conservation

Threats and concerns

The preponderance of asexual reproduction in this species raises the possibility that genetic diversity in the remnant populations may be very low. These uncertainties as to recruitment/recovery potential and genetic status are the basis for conservation concerns for this species.

From 1970 to 2020, there has been a significant decline in the population of Acropora cerviconis in the Florida Keys caused by a combination of coral disease and bleaching as well as other stressors such as pollution and predation. In order to reduce the loss of this species, the Coral Restoration Foundation in conjunction with the NOAA Recovery Plan (NRP) started in 2007 outplanting coral projects to restore populations at sites in the Florida Keys National Marine Sanctuary where A. cerviconis was previously abundant.

ESA listing history
On March 4, 2004, the Center for Biological Diversity petitioned NMFS to list elkhorn (Acropora palmata), staghorn (A. cervicornis), and fused-staghorn (A. prolifera) coral under the ESA. On June 23, 2004, NOAA Fisheries found that listing these species may be warranted and initiated a formal review of their biological status. NMFS convened the Atlantic Acropora Biological Review Team to summarize the best available scientific and commercial data available for these species in the status review report.

The BRT completed the status review March 3, 2005. On March 18, 2005, NMFS determined elkhorn and staghorn corals warrant listing as "threatened" species under the ESA. However, NMFS also concluded listing fused-staghorn coral is not warranted, as it is a hybrid and does not constitute a species as defined under the ESA. On May 9, 2005, NMFS proposed adding elkhorn coral to the endangered species list.

NMFS designated critical habitat for elkhorn and staghorn corals in 2008.

In December 2012 NMFS again proposed reclassifying (77 FR 73219) the elkhorn and staghorn corals as endangered, but determined in September 2014 that they would remain listed as threatened (79 FR 53852).

Gallery

References

Further reading

NOAA Fisheries Species Directory - Staghorn Coral (Acropora cervicornis)

Acropora
Corals described in 1816
ESA threatened species